Il processo di Verona (internationally released as The Verona Trial) is a 1963 Italian historical drama film directed by Carlo Lizzani. The film tells of the final phases of the Italian fascist regime, in particular the affair of the 1944 Verona trial, in which Galeazzo Ciano, Emilio De Bono, Giovanni Marinelli and other eminent Fascist officials (Carlo Pareschi and Luciano Gottardi) were sentenced to death and almost immediately executed by a shooting detachment, while Tullio Cianetti was sentenced to 30 years imprisonment.

For her portrayal of Edda Mussolini-Ciano, Silvana Mangano won the two major Italian film awards, the David di Donatello for Best Actress and the Silver Ribbon in the same category.

Cast 
 Silvana Mangano as Edda Ciano (Mussolini's daughter; Ciano's wife)
 Frank Wolff as  count Galeazzo Ciano (Mussolini's son-in-law and former Minister of Foreign Affairs)
 Vivi Gioi as  Donna Rachele (Mussolini's wife)
 Françoise Prévost as  Frau Beetz (a member of a German Secret Service)
 Salvo Randone as  Andrea Fortunato (public prosecutor)
 Giorgio De Lullo as  Alessandro Pavolini
 Ivo Garrani as  Roberto Farinacci
 Andrea Checchi as  Dino Grandi
 Henri Serre as  Emilio Pucci
 Claudio Gora as  Judge Vincenzo Cersosimo
 Carlo D'Angelo as  Console Vianini
 Umberto D'Orsi as  Luciano Gottardi
 Filippo Scelzo as Giovanni Marinelli
 Andrea Bosic as Tullio Cianetti
 Gennaro Di Gregorio as Emilio De Bono

References

Further reading
 Carlo Lizzani, Ugo Pirro, Il Processo di Verona, Capelli, 1963

External links

1963 films
Italian drama films
Films directed by Carlo Lizzani
Films set in 1943
Films set in 1944
Films with screenplays by Ugo Pirro
Films produced by Dino De Laurentiis
Films scored by Mario Nascimbene
1963 drama films
1960s Italian-language films
1960s Italian films